Ten Years Are Gone is a double album by John Mayall.  Record one (Tracks 1-9) was recorded at Sunset Sound, Los Angeles, and record two (Tracks 10-14) was recorded in concert at the New York Academy of Music.  The album was released in 1973. Like its predecessors Jazz Blues Fusion and Moving On, it features Freddy Robinson on guitar and Blue Mitchell on trumpet.

Track listing
All tracks composed by John Mayall; except where indicated

 "Ten Years Are Gone" – 4:46
 "Driving Till The Break of Day" – 5:03
 "Drifting" – 4.34
 "Better Pass You By" – 5:12
 "California Campground" – 3:12
 "Undecided" (Freddy Robinson) – 2:51
 "Good Looking Stranger" – 4:23
 "I Still Care" – 4:17
 "Don't Hang Me Up" – 4:11
 "Introduction" – 2:05
 "Sitting Here Thinking" – 7:58
 "Harmonica Free Form" – 11:36
 "Burning Sun" – 5:10
 "Dark of the Night" – 17:41

Personnel 
 John Mayall – piano, guitar, harmonica, vocals (on all tracks except 6)
 Freddy Robinson – guitar, vocal (track 6 only)
 Victor Gaskin – bass
 Keef Hartley – drums
 Sugarcane Harris – violin (studio album only)
 Blue Mitchell – trumpet, flugelhorn
 Red Holloway – alto & tenor saxophone, flute (studio album only)
 Fred Clark - saxophones (live album only)
Technical
Wayne Dailey – engineer
Leandro Correa, Andy Kent – photography

Live album recorded in late 1972.

References

1973 albums
John Mayall albums
Albums produced by John Mayall
Albums produced by Don Nix
Polydor Records albums